The Cité de Carcassonne is a medieval citadel located in the French city of Carcassonne, in the Aude department, Occitanie region. It is situated on a hill on the right bank of the River Aude, in the southeast part of the city proper. The citadel was restored at the end of the 19th century and in 1997 it was added to the UNESCO list of World Heritage Sites because of its exceptional testimony to the architecture and planning of a medieval fortress town.

An image of the historic city of Carcassonne appears on the emblem of local rugby league team, AS Carcassonne.

History

Early history
The town has about 2,500 years of history and has been occupied in different ages by Romans, Visigoths and Crusaders. At the beginning of its history it was a Gaulish settlement then in the 3rd century AD, the Romans decided to transform it into a fortified town. The Roman defences were in place by 333 AD, when the town is described as a castellum. The original walls were supported by between 34 and 40 towers, spaced from 18 to 30 metres apart along the curtain wall. Each tower was semicircular in plan and about 14 metres tall. There were probably 40 main entrances to the town.

The Gallo-Roman walls were rebuilt during the town's occupation by the Visigoths in the 5th and 6th centuries, but the original structure remained in place.

Bernard Aton IV Trencavel, vicomte of Albi, Nîmes and Béziers, introduced a period of prosperity for the city with numerous construction projects. During this period, a new sect known as Catharism sprang up in Languedoc. In 1096, the Viscount of Trencavel authorised the construction of the Basilica of Saint-Nazaire with the blessing of Pope Urban II. In 1107, the citizens rejected his sovereignty and called on Ramon Berenguer III, Count of Barcelona to remove him. However, with the help of Bertrand, Count of Toulouse, Bernard Aton regained control of the Cité. In 1120, there was a second revolt, but Bernard Aton re-established order a few years later. In 1130, he started construction of a palace for himself and restoration of the Gallo-Roman fortifications. The Cité of Carcassonne was surrounded by a complete fortification for the first time.

At this time, the city had a large population of three to four thousand, including the residents of the two settlements below the walls of the Cité: the bourg Saint-Vincent on the north and the bourg Saint-Michel south of the Narbon gate.

In 1208, Pope Innocent III called on the barons of the north to mount a crusade against the Cathars, beginning with the Albigensian Crusade. The Count of Toulouse, accused of heresy, as well as his principal vassal, the Viscount of Trencavel, were the main target of this attack. On 1 August 1209, the Cité was besieged by the crusaders. Raimond-Roger Trencavel surrendered quickly on 15 August in exchange for the lives of the citizens. The town around the Cité was destroyed and the citizens driven out. The vicomte died of dysentery in his own château on 10 November 1209.

His lands were given to Simon de Montfort, the leader of the crusaders. When he died in 1218 at the siege of  Toulouse, his son, Amaury de Montfort, took possession of the Cité, but was unable to maintain it. He ceded it to Louis VIII of France, but Raymond VII of Toulouse and the counts of Foix allied themselves against him. In 1224, Raimond II Trencavel retook the Cité. However, Louis VIII launched another crusade in 1226. From that time forth, the Cité became a royal domain. A period of terror ensued, with numerous massacres and the Inquisition.

After 1226, an additional line of fortifications was added outside of the Roman walls. The town was finally annexed to the Kingdom of France in 1247 AD. It provided a strong French frontier between France and the Crown of Aragon. During this period, the inner, Roman walls were largely demolished and replaced, while the new outer walls were reinforced and extended to the south. The new towers built during this work were mainly circular, but two were square. Construction continued into the reign of King Philip IV in the early 14th century.

In 1659, after the Treaty of the Pyrenees, the province of Roussillon became a part of France and the town lost its military significance. Fortifications were abandoned and the town became one of the economic centres of France, concentrating on the woolen textile industry.

Restoration

In 1849 the Government of France decided that the city fortifications should be demolished. This decision was strongly opposed by the local people.  and literary personality Prosper Mérimée, both noted archaeologists and historians, led a campaign to preserve the fortress as a historical monument. The government later reversed its decision and in 1853 restoration work began. The architect Eugène Viollet-le-Duc was charged with renovating the fortress. Viollet-le-Duc's work was criticised during his lifetime as inappropriate to the climate and traditions of the region. After his death in 1879, the restoration work was continued by his pupil, Paul Boeswillwald, and later by the architect Nodet.

Panorama

The legend of Lady Carcas 

Lady  is a legendary character from the city of Carcassonne. According to the legend, she is the wife of Ballak, the Muslim prince of Carcassonne, who was killed in action against Charlemagne. Lady , following the death of her husband, allegedly took charge of the city's defence against the Frankish army and repelled it. Princess  first used a trick consisting of making fake soldiers, which she had manufactured and placed in each tower of the city. The siege lasted five years.

But by the beginning of the sixth year, food and water were becoming increasingly scarce. Lady  wanted to make an inventory of all the reserves left. The city was Saracen, so a part of the population, being Muslim, did not consume pork. The villagers brought her a pig and a bag of wheat. She then had the idea of feeding the pig with the sack of wheat and then pushing it from the highest tower of the city at the foot of the outer ramparts.

Charlemagne and his men, believing that the city was still overflowing with soldiers and food to the point of wasting a wheat-fed pig, ended the siege. Seeing Charlemagne's army leaving the plain in front of the city, Lady  was filled with joy at the victory of her ploy and decided to ring all the city's bells. One of Charlemagne's men then shouted: "Carcas is ringing!", in French "Carcas sonne!" thus creating the name of the city.

References

External links 

 The fortified city of Carcassonne - The official website: castle of the Counts of Carcassonne and the ramparts (in English).
 French Ministry of Culture site on the Cité of Carcassonne, with history and virtual tour (English version available)
 Mescladis, a site about Carcassonne, the Cité and the Bastide Saint-Louis – history and architecture 
 Le Château de Carcassonne at chateauxmedievaux.com, with numerous pictures 
 La Cité de Carcassonne on Wikisource (1888 and 1890 editions)

Carcassonne
History of Aude
World Heritage Sites in France
Carcassonne
Buildings and structures in Aude
Museums in Aude
Monuments historiques of Aude